Gasteroclupea is a genus of prehistoric clupeiform fish that is related to modern anchovies and herrings. Its fossils date back to the Maastrichtian stage of the Late Cretaceous period. Fossils of the genus have been found in the Yacoraite Formation of Argentina and the El Molino Formation of Bolivia.

References

External links 

 Gasteroclupea branisai

Prehistoric ray-finned fish genera
Cretaceous bony fish
Maastrichtian life
Prehistoric fish of South America
Cretaceous Argentina
Fossils of Argentina
Cretaceous Bolivia
Fossils of Bolivia
Fossil taxa described in 1964